Justin Sorensen (born June 8, 1986) is a former professional Canadian football offensive lineman of the Canadian Football League (CFL). He was drafted by the BC Lions in the first round of the 2008 CFL Draft and spent two years with the team before joining the Winnipeg Blue Bombers. After two seasons with the Blue Bombers, he signed as a free agent with the Eskimos on February 11, 2014. He earned his first Grey Cup championship as a member of the 103rd Grey Cup champion Eskimos, starting at centre in both the West Final and Grey Cup. He played college football for the South Carolina Gamecocks.

Sorensen attended Ballenas Secondary School, where he was co-team captain for the Ballenas Whalers football team. Justin was widely regarded as the top offensive lineman in BC High School Football and received heavy NCAA D1 interest. Justin was a two way starter as the top offensive tackle in the league and a solid defensive lineman.

External links
Edmonton Eskimos bio 
Winnipeg Blue Bombers bio

1986 births
Living people
BC Lions players
Canadian football offensive linemen
Canadian players of American football
Edmonton Elks players
People from Parksville, British Columbia
Players of Canadian football from British Columbia
South Carolina Gamecocks football players
Winnipeg Blue Bombers players